Madame X (Spanish: La mujer X) is a 1955 Mexican drama film directed by Julián Soler and starring Libertad Lamarque.

Cast
In alphabetical order
 Víctor Alcocer 
 Emilio Brillas 
 Silvia Derbez 
 Manuel Dondé 
 José Ángel Espinosa 'Ferrusquilla' 
 Paquito Fernández 
 Miguel Ángel Ferriz 
 Víctor Junco 
 Libertad Lamarque 
 Rodolfo Landa 
 José María Linares-Rivas 
 Miguel Ángel López 
 Julio Monterde 
 José Elías Moreno 
 Juan Orraca 
 Alejandro Parodi 
 José Pulido 
 Carlos Robles Gil 
 Beatriz Saavedra 
 Hortensia Santoveña 
 Andrés Soler 
 Aurora Walker

References

Bibliography 
 Darlene J. Sadlier. Latin American Melodrama: Passion, Pathos, and Entertainment. University of Illinois Press, 2009.

External links 
 

1955 films
1955 drama films
Mexican drama films
1950s Spanish-language films
Films directed by Julián Soler
Mexican films based on plays
Mexican black-and-white films
1950s Mexican films